Ken Tasaka (1905 – 1997) was a Japanese painter. His work was part of the painting event in the art competition at the 1936 Summer Olympics.

References

1905 births
1997 deaths
20th-century Japanese painters
Japanese painters
Olympic competitors in art competitions
People from Tokyo